Edward Nucella Emmett (18 February 1817 – 18 March 1874) was an English born Australian entrepreneur and politician, briefly a member of the Victorian Legislative Council.

Career
Emmett worked as an auctioneer in Adelaide, South Australia. He lived in Bendigo from 1852 to 1870, first as a gold digger and then an auctioneer. He was said to be the first discoverer of the Hustler's Reef near Bendigo. With Hugh Smith, he established the Bendigo Bank (subsequently purchased by the then Bank of Victoria). He later started a brewery and a number of mining companies. To secure Bendigo's future, Emmett worked to establish a reliable water supply, and was the main promoter of the Bendigo Waterworks Company (now part of Coliban Water), established in 1858.

Given the financial problems of the Victorian colonial government, and the lack of local government funds, he worked to privately fund the new water supply. The Sandhurst (Bendigo) council controlled a 22-acre water reserve site along the Bendigo Creek at Golden Square. With funding from wealthy investors in Melbourne he formed the company which was incorporated by parliament. Joseph Brady was the first engineer for the project, which made use of water from the Coliban River.

He went to Sydney after 1870, where he was a broker, legal manager and mining agent.

Government
Emmett was nominated as a Member of the Victorian Legislative Council from 29 August 1853 to September 1853, but resigned in early September, after being rejected by a gold diggers' meeting and may never have taken his seat. He was first chairman of the Sandhurst (Bendigo) municipal council and, subsequently, of the municipality of Raywood, of which he was also the first chairman.

After the sale of the bank, he acted in a number of official roles, including town valuator, and conducted first government land sales. He was a member of first local court (1855), and mining registrar at Raywood (1863).

Family
Emmett was the son of Henry James Emmett and Mary Elizabeth Thompson Emmett (née Townsend) who immigrated to Van Diemen's Land from England with their young family in 1819 fifteen years after the establishment of Hobart Town (1804).

He had two families in South Australia, abandoning his common law wife, Sarah Ann Dolby, and their three children before the end of 1856, 
he had married Sarah Spottiswood Blackham in 1849 and moved with her to Bendigo (then called Sandhurst).

After his death, his widow and their only surviving daughter, Bertha, returned to Bendigo, where in 1876 it became known that they were in straitened circumstance with a number of gifts made to them. Later in that year she married Archibald Forsyth.

References

1817 births
1874 deaths
Australian gold prospectors
Australian auctioneers
Australian bankers
Members of the Victorian Legislative Council
English emigrants to colonial Australia
19th-century Australian politicians
19th-century Australian businesspeople